is a popular Japanese folk song written by  and composed by .

General 
The song was composed for the  that took place in Shima, Mie in 1970. The song appeared on the popular single record  released by the folk group  on February 5, 1971, becoming nationally known. In September 1973, Sumiko Yamagata released a reprise of the song in the album .

Shoji Hashimoto, the editor of the publishing house Kyouiku Geijutsu-sha, decided to include the song in a choir textbook, causing it to be sung by choirs across Japan. By the second half of the 1970s, most people in Japan were familiar with the song.

Megumi Yokota once sang this song at a school competition.

The song was chosen as the official theme of the national team of Japan during the 1998 FIFA World Cup.

A version of this song performed by Megumi Hayashibara is part of the soundtrack for the film Evangelion: 2.0 You Can (Not) Advance  by Hideaki Anno.

Covers 

Many Japanese artists have released a cover version of this song:

 Babymetal
 D=OUT
 Sayaka Ichii with Yūko Nakazawa
 Kazumasa Oda
 Kanon
 Houkago Tea Time
 Hideaki Tokunaga
 Megumi Hayashibara (present on the soundtrack of Evangelion: 2.0 You Can (Not) Advance)
 Ayaka Hirahara
 Saki Fukuda
 ManaKana
 Mucc
 Shūichi Murakami
 Saori Yuki
 Tanaka Yukio and Minami Maho (present on the soundtrack of BECK: Mongolian chop squad)
 Misato Watanabe
 Sakurakō Keion-bu (present on the soundtrack of K-ON!)
 Sayaka Sasaki (Second end credits of Nichijou)
 Misaki Iwasa
 Yui
 Megumi Toyoguchi (episode 7 of Danganronpa 3: The End of Hope's Peak High School Despair Arc)

This song has also been covered by several non-Japanese artists:

 Susan Boyle
 Jason Kouchak
 Hayley Westenra
 Kat McDowell
 Beckii Cruel

1971 songs
1991 singles
Japanese folk songs